Nick Venema (born 9 April 1999) is a Dutch professional footballer who plays as a forward for Eerste Divisie club VVV-Venlo.

Club career

Utrecht
Venema played for several clubs in his youth, including hometown club SV Austerlitz, VW Woudenberg, and RODA '46, before joining the FC Utrecht youth academy. He made his professional debut in the Eerste Divisie for the reserve team Jong FC Utrecht on 5 August 2016 in a game against NAC Breda.

He made his Eredivisie debut for FC Utrecht on 12 February 2017 in a game against PSV Eindhoven, coming on as a substitute for Richairo Zivkovic. He scored his first goal for the senior squad on 29 October 2017 in a 2–2 home draw against NAC Breda. The goal came in the 78th minute, seven minutes after Venema has been subbed on for Cyriel Dessers. His goal was the equalizer, and the last goal of the game.

Loan to Almere City
On 28 August 2019 he joined Almere City on a season-long loan.

Loan to NAC Breda
On 27 August 2020 he joined NAC Breda on a season-long loan. He made 32 appearances during the season in which he scored five goals, as NAC missed out on promotion to the Eredivisie in the finals of the play-offs.

Return to Utrecht
Venema returned to Utrecht ahead of the 2021–22 season, where he once again became part of the reserve team Jong FC Utrecht. There, he took on a new role as the experienced striker under head coach Darije Kalezić.

VVV-Venlo
On 24 December 2021, Venema was loaned to VVV-Venlo for the rest of the season. On 22 June 2022, the deal was made permanent and Venema signed a three-year deal with the club.

International career
Venema debuted for the Netherlands U17 team on 7 February 2016 in a friendly against Portugal. He played 70 minutes of that match, and the game ended 1–1. His U19 debut came on 30 August 2017 in a 2–1 friendly loss to Belgium. He only played 18 minutes of that match. His first and second international goals came in the same game, a friendly against Finland. The game ended 9–0 in favor of the Netherlands, with Venema scoring the 8th and 9th goals, in the 80th and 90th minute respectively. He only played 18 minutes of that game as well.

Career statistics

Club

References

External links
 
 Nick Venema at FCUtrecht.nl

1999 births
Living people
Footballers from Utrecht (city)
Association football forwards
Dutch footballers
Netherlands youth international footballers
Eerste Divisie players
Eredivisie players
Jong FC Utrecht players
FC Utrecht players
Almere City FC players
NAC Breda players
VVV-Venlo players